Sir Archibald Birkmyre, 1st Baronet, CBE (28 June 1875 – 24 June 1935) was a Scottish jute manufacturer and merchant in India.

Birkmyre was born at Springbank House, in Kilmacolm, Renfrewshire, the son of manufacturer Henry Birkmyre and his wife, Margaret (née Sommerville). He became senior partner of the family firm, Birkmyre Brothers, in Calcutta and also served on the Viceroy of India's Legislative Council and the Bengal Legislative Council. He was vice-president of the Bengal Chamber of Commerce.

In 1915, Birkmyre constructed a 4-story building on Middleton Row in Kolkata as a tribute to his friend, Dr. Anderson Graham.  In support of the children of Kalimpong, Dr. Graham used this building to house graduating students of St. Andrews Colonial Homes so they could attend university in Kolkata.

Birkmyre was knighted in 1917, appointed Commander of the Order of the British Empire (CBE) in 1918, and created a baronet in the 1921 New Year Honours.

Footnotes

References
The Times of India,  The Times of India, 21 May 2021
Obituary, The Times, 25 June 1935
Who Was Who, London, A. & C. Black

1875 births
1935 deaths
Scottish businesspeople
Businesspeople from Kolkata
Baronets in the Baronetage of the United Kingdom
Knights Bachelor
Businesspeople awarded knighthoods
Commanders of the Order of the British Empire
People from Renfrewshire